Goh Cheng Huat is a Malaysian basketball coach who is the head coach of the Malaysia national basketball team since May 2016. He has also served the same position from 2009-2011.

Goh also served as coach for the Westports KL Dragons from 2009 to 2011, when Filipino coach Ariel Vanguardia replaced him as coach of the basketball team, so he can concentrate on the national team.

Goh was again appointed as the head coach of the KL Dragons, now renamed as Blustar Detergent Dragons, of the PBA D-League in 2016, following the appointment of Westports Malaysia Dragons consultant Ariel Vanguardia as the new mentor of Phoenix Fuel Masters.

References

1955 births
Malaysian basketball coaches
Living people
Malaysian people of Chinese descent
ASEAN Basketball League coaches